St Lawrence's Hospital may refer to:
Hospital of St Lawrence, Acton
St Lawrence's Hospital, Bodmin
St Lawrence's Hospital, Caterham
St Lawrence Hospital, Chepstow